Pontiac High School is an English-language High School in Shawville, Quebec, Canada with about 400 students. It is operated by the Western Quebec School Board.

Notable alumni
Wing Commander Robert Carl 'Moose' Fumerton (March 21, 1913 - July 10, 2006)

References

External links
Official site

High schools in Quebec
Education in Outaouais